The Sims Mobile is a life simulation game based on The Sims 4 and The Sims FreePlay for Android and iOS devices. It was announced on May 9, 2017, in a launch trailer. The game was released on March 6, 2018. It features a multiplayer component and includes story elements.

Gameplay 
In The Sims Mobile, players are able to create unique Sims with the in-game character creator (Create-a-Sim), build houses, start families and control the lives of their Sims. The game introduces multiplayer elements, as players can 'interact with other players' Sims by attending their parties, tapping on an NPC (non-playable character), or rating their Sims as through a sticker system.

Similarly to previous mobile games in The Sims franchise, energy is used when players take actions with their Sims. Energy can be restored through SimCash, which is earned through in-game quests and micro-transactions. SimCash can also be used to purchase certain premium clothing and furniture options in the game.

Unlike its predecessor The Sims FreePlay, The Sims Mobile offers a closer experience to the PC series of games. There is a focus on telling stories through Sim's actions, chosen by the player as their Sims go through their career or make relationships. As Sims play through these stories, they are able to level up and unlock new cutscenes. Advancing stories may also unlock new furniture or clothing items.

Release 
On May 9, 2017, the game was available for testing on the App Store and Google Play in Brazil. On March 6, 2018, The Sims Mobile was launched worldwide, but Hong Kong, Mainland China and other parts of Asia were not open for download.

In 2019, development was transferred from Maxis to Firemonkeys Studios, which also develops The Sims FreePlay.

Reception 
The Sims Mobile received "Mixed or average reviews" from critics, holding an aggregated Metacritic score of 73/100.

Common Sense Media gave the game 3/5 stars, describing it as an "Energy-based life sim" that is "progress purchase-dependent". The Verge praised the game, declaring: "Maxis has successfully pared down a very full series into an accessible, easy-to-play game for your commute or bedtime routine". Kotaku complimented the timer and energy meters and praised the relationship mechanic. Shacknews criticized the timers and the micro-transactions, saying : "As it stands, unless you're really jonesing for a Sims fix while on the go, there isn't much of a reason to let The Sims Mobile insult you by peppering you with its seemingly endless barrage of microtransactions".

Upon its release, The Sims Mobile topped the App Store. During its four months release, The Sims Mobile generated a total of US$15 million. As of July 2018, the game generated between US$20 million and US$25 million.

Awards 

The game was nominated for "Outstanding Video Game" at the 30th GLAAD Media Awards.

References

External links 
 

2018 video games
Android (operating system) games
Free-to-play video games
God games
IOS games
Life simulation games
Mobile
Video games developed in the United States
Video games scored by Silas Hite